is a town located in Ikoma District, Nara Prefecture, Japan.

As of April 1, 2017, the town has an estimated population of 7,523 and 3,395  households. The density is 1700 persons per km², and the total area is 4.33 km².

Geography 
Located in the northwestern portion of Nara Prefecture, it is a relatively small town situated close to the center of the Nara Basin. The Tomio River and Yamato River flow through Ando.

History 
 1889 - Five villages are merged in Heguri District, creating Ando village.
 1896 - Heguri District is united by Soejimo District, creating Ikoma District.
 1986 - Ando village is renamed Ando town.

Education 
 Primary Schools
 Ando Elementary School
 Junior High Schools
 Ando Junior High School

Places of note 
 Ando Cultural Museum
 Tomimoto Kenichi Memorial Museum
 Nakake House

Transportation

Rail 
West Japan Railway Company's Kansai Main Line (Yamatoji Line) passes through Ando. However, no stations are found in the town.

Road 
Expressways
Nishi-Meihan Expressway

References

External links 

  

Towns in Nara Prefecture